WBSI may refer to:

 West Bengal Survey Institute, Bandel, West Bengal, India; a public technical college
 Western Behavioral Sciences Institute, La Jolla, California, USA; a human affairs research institute
 WBSI-FM, Bay Shore, Long Island, New York, USA; former name of radio station WBZO

See also
 German weather ship WBS 1 Hermann, for "WBS1"
 WBS (disambiguation)
 BSI (disambiguation)
 CBSI (disambiguation)
 KBSI (disambiguation)